The 1978–79 season is Real Madrid Club de Fútbol's 77th season in existence and the club's 48th consecutive season in the top flight of Spanish football.

Summary
Nineteen days after the death of Santiago Bernabéu, Luis De Carlos was appointed as new President of the club on 21 June 1978. The new Chairman released a new board of directors on 1 September 1978 in an attempt to normalize the club after the turmoil of last year. Owing to financial issues including a growing debt, De Carlos did not reinforced the squad with high-profile players, instead of that, there had a few low-cost arrivals such as: Rafael García Cortés and Francisco García Hernández along Maté and Hipólito Rincón in a sign of austerity for upcoming years, in an era known as "The Madrid of Los Garcia" until 1982.

In the European Cup the team, shockingly, was eliminated early in the second round by underdogs Swiss side Grasshopper Club Zürich on the away goals rule. Meanwhile, in the Copa del Rey the squad advanced to the final where it was defeated by Valencia CF 2–0 at Vicente Calderón Stadium.

The club clinched its 19th League title also second in a row, four points above runners-up Sporting Gijón. Had they also won the Copa del Rey, Real Madrid would've clinched the double, something they would achieve next season.

Squad

Transfers

Competitions

La Liga

Position by round

League table

Matches

Copa del Rey

Final

European Cup

First round

Second round

Statistics

Players statistics

See also
The Madrid of los Garcia (in Spanish)

References

External links
 BDFútbol

Real Madrid CF seasons
Spanish football championship-winning seasons
Real Madrid